Peter Hewitt (born 9 October 1962) is an English film director and writer.

Career
Upon graduating from the National Film and Television School in 1990, Hewitt flew to the United States with his BAFTA award-winning short film, The Candy Show, in hand. Once there, he called executives from major Hollywood studios and asked if he could show them his film. Soon after, he landed an agent and made his feature film directorial debut with Bill & Ted's Bogus Journey. Although not as big a success as the original, Bill & Ted's Excellent Adventure, the movie made a profit.

He turned to TV next, directing the first two hours of the miniseries Wild Palms. He directed Disney's Tom and Huck in 1995 which was based on Mark Twain's The Adventures of Tom Sawyer. Hewitt returned to the U.K. to film The Borrowers, loosely based on a children's novel by Mary Norton of the same name. He remained in England to helm Whatever Happened to Harold Smith? (1999), then tried his hand at TV work again with The Princess of Thieves (2001), filmed in Romania but featuring a mostly British cast, including a young Keira Knightley as Robin Hood's daughter, Gwyn.

Hewitt co-wrote the script for his next film, Thunderpants. It was filmed in the U.K.
Hewitt later went on to direct a few other movies, most notably the 2004 film adaptation of the comic strip Garfield and the 2006 Tim Allen superhero comedy film Zoom (the latter of which was a massive box office flop, only being able to recoup $12.5 million of its $75.6 million budget). More recently, he directed Home Alone 5: The Holiday Heist, which was produced for television, first aired on ABC Family (now Freeform) in 2012, and never received a theatrical release, but it was released on DVD in 2013.

Filmography

Film

Television

Trivia

According to the DVD commentary for Garfield: The Movie, Peter Hewitt had expressed interest in directing a Garfield sequel. Hewitt later became attached to direct the 2006 movie Zoom, and so he became unavailable to direct the Garfield sequel, which was instead directed by Tim Hill. This is ironic, because Peter Hewitt is British and Tim Hill is American, and the Garfield sequel took place in Hewitt's native country of England.
His paternal cousin Simon Hewitt was a longtime animatronic designer for Jim Henson's Creature Shop until it permanently closed in 2005.

External links

Peter Hewitt at Rotten Tomatoes

Living people
1962 births
English film directors
Alumni of the National Film and Television School
People from Brighton
Comedy film directors